Henry E. Murphy Beck, (also called Henry E. M. Beck,  born June 6, 1986) is an American lawyer and Democratic politician from Waterville, Maine. He has served as Maine State Treasurer since 2019.

Biography 
Beck graduated from Waterville High School and from Colby College. He served on the Waterville City Council.

Beck served in the Maine House of Representatives representing District 110 from December 2008 until December 2016. In 2011 he was appointed to serve on the Commission to Apportion Maine's Congressional Districts. He served as the Chair of Joint Standing Committee on Insurance and Financial Services.

He was term-limited in 2016, running instead for the Maine State Senate. He lost to the incumbent, Republican Scott Cyrway. He was succeeded in the House by fellow Democrat Colleen Madigan, whom Cyrway had unseated from the Senate two years before.

A former Democratic lawmaker, Beck was elected Maine State Treasurer on December 6, 2018, after the Democrats reclaimed both houses of the Maine Legislature. He defeated incumbent Treasurer Terry Hayes, an independent backed by the Republicans. He assumed office on January 2, 2019.

During the 2020 Democratic Party presidential primaries, Beck endorsed former South Bend, Indiana mayor Pete Buttigieg.

References

External links 
Official website

1986 births
Colby College alumni
Living people
Maine city council members
Maine lawyers
Democratic Party members of the Maine House of Representatives
Politicians from Waterville, Maine
State treasurers of Maine